The Speos Artemidos (Grotto of Artemis) is an archaeological site in Egypt. It is located about 2 km south of the Middle Kingdom tombs at Beni Hasan, and about 28 km south of Al Minya. Today, the site is a small village known as Istabl Antar.

There are two temples here, both of which are dedicated to Pakhet. They are cut out of the rock into the cliffs on the eastern side of the Nile. One of the temples, built by the pharaoh Hatshepsut, has an architrave bearing a long dedicatory text with her famous denunciation of the Hyksos. Nearby is a small shrine bearing the name of Alexander IV of Macedon.

An earlier temple was probably located here, but no traces older than that of Hatshepsut have been found. The decorations inside have been usurped by Seti I in places, his name replacing that of Hatshepsut.

Cut from the living rock, Hatshepsut's temple is composed of two chambers connected by a short passageway. The outer portico is rectangular and originally had eight stone columns arranged in two rows Unfortunately, only three of the four columns forming the facade are still relatively intact and none of the internal pillars remain. The rock face above the external pillars of the portico is dressed and inscribed with text bearing Hatshesput's name. It includes the famous text in which she denounces the Hyksos and records her actions in rebuilding the damage they had caused thus legitimising her own reign. Within the portico only the southern wall bears any inscription. The text originally referred to Hatshepsut but was usurped by Seti I who also added further dedications. The smaller inner sanctuary is square with a statue niche at the back. It was not inscribed by Hatshepsut and Brand has suggested that it was in fact Seti who first excavated the passageway and sanctuary.

Seti altered the text to replace Hatshepsut's name with his own and changed representations of the Queen to depictions of himself, but Fairman and Grdseloff argued that there was no clear evidence that Tuthmosis III defaced the chapel when he was expunging her name from other monuments late in his reign despite the existence of his name on some of the pillars of the portico. This conclusion is queried by Brand who suggests that an image of the queen had been vandalised by Tuthmosis and later recarved to depict Seti. Likewise Fairman and Grdseloff did not find evidence that Akhenaten had defaced the name of Amun but Brand concluded that Seti had repaired this damage and notes at least one instance where an earlier version of one of the arms of Amun was still visible. Brand notes that Seti also replaced an image of a priest with that of the god Thoth and concludes that this was the result of the increasing influence of this god's temple in Hermopolis during the reign of Seti. Finally Brand notes that Seti added three scenes to the depictions of the coronation of Hatshepsut but (contrary to Fairman and Grdseloff) found no evidence that he had usurped these scenes from Hatshepsut.

References

Further reading

 Fakhry, Ahmed, A new speos from the reign of Hatshepsut and Thutmosis III at Beni-Hasan, In: Annales du Service des Antiquités de l’Égypte, Issue 39 (1939), S. 709 – 723
 Brand, Peter James (2000) The monuments of Seti I: epigraphic, historical, and art historical analysis
 Gardiner, Alan Henderson, Davies’s copy of the great Speos Artemidos inscription, In: Journal of Egyptian Archaeology Issue 32 (1946), S. 43 – 56
 Fairman, H. W.; Grdseloff, B., Texts of Hatshepsut and Sethos I inside Speos Artemidos, In: Journal of Egyptian Archaeology, Issue 33 (1947), S. 12 – 33
 Goedicke, Hans. "The Speos Artemidos Inscription of Hatshepsut and Related Discussions". Oakville, CT: HALGO, 2004. Print.

Buildings and structures completed in the 15th century BC
Archaeological sites in Egypt
Populated places in Minya Governorate
Hatshepsut
15th-century BC establishments in Egypt